Iuri Filosi (born 17 January 1992) is an Italian professional racing cyclist, who most recently rode for UCI ProTeam . He was named in the start list for the 2016 Giro d'Italia, but finished outside the time limit on Stage 8.

Major results

2013
 2nd Piccolo Giro di Lombardia
2014
 2nd  Road race, UEC European Under-23 Road Championships
 5th Gran Premio della Liberazione
 6th Road race, UCI Under-23 Road World Championships
 6th Gran Premio Palio del Recioto
2015
 7th Gran Premio Nobili Rubinetterie
2016
 5th Volta Limburg Classic
2017
 1st Gran Premio di Lugano
 8th Overall Four Days of Dunkirk
2018
 10th Circuito de Getxo

Grand Tour general classification results timeline

References

External links
 

1992 births
Living people
Italian male cyclists
Cyclists from the Province of Brescia